Kleve (Cleves in English use) or Kreis Kleve is a Kreis (local-government district) in the Lower Rhine region of northwestern North Rhine-Westphalia, Germany. Neighbouring districts are Borken, Wesel, and Viersen in Germany, and the Dutch provinces of Limburg and Gelderland.

History

The district in its current borders was created in 1975 when the former district of Kleve and Geldern was merged with the Rees District towns of Emmerich and Rees and the Moers District municipality of Rheurdt.

The two precursor districts had been created in 1816 when the whole of the Rhineland became a province of Prussia. Territorially they corresponded roughly to the historic Duchies of Cleves and Guelders.

Geography

The district is located in the lower valley of the Rhine, in the region where that river flows into the Netherlands.

Coat of arms
The coat of arms, which was granted in 1983, combines the shields of the two constituent duchies.

The dexter side depicts the emblem of the dukes of Cleves: On a red (gules) field a white (argent) escutcheon (shield shape) with an eightfold fleur-de-lys (escarbuncle/metal shield reinforcement). The sinister side shows a golden (or) lion (in rampant position) on a blue (azure) field (background): the emblem of the dukes of Geldern.

Towns and municipalities

Gallery of churches in Kleve

References

External links

 

 
Districts of North Rhine-Westphalia